Norman Otto Wagner, Jr. (February 5, 1912 – April 22, 1998) was an American professional basketball player. He played in the National Basketball League for three different teams during the 1937–38 season, including the Dayton Metropolitans, Columbus Athletic Supply, and Cincinnati Comellos. In eight career games he averaged 4.3 points per game.

References

1912 births
1998 deaths
American men's basketball players
Baseball players from St. Louis
Basketball players from St. Louis
Centers (basketball)
Cincinnati Comellos players
Columbus Athletic Supply players
Dayton Metropolitans players
Missouri Tigers baseball players
Missouri Tigers men's basketball players